Amakusaplana is a genus of free-living marine polyclad flatworms in the family Prosthiostomidae.

Species 
 Amakusaplana acroporae
 Amakusaplana ohshimai

References

External links 

Turbellaria genera